Keratin implantation cysts are cysts lined by an epidermal sac and filled with a form of keratin. They are a primarily cutaneous condition, but they are occasionally observed under the nail (anatomy), of a finger or toe.

See also 
 Nail (anatomy)

References 

Epidermal nevi, neoplasms, and cysts